Soma Wind Farm is an onshore wind power plant in Soma in Manisa Province in the northwestern Aegean Region of Turkey. Built in two phases and consisting of 119 wind turbines with an installed output power of 140 MW in total, it is one of Turkey's largest wind farms.

The wind farm was constructed and is operated by Polat Energy, a joint venture company of Polat Holding, which is owned by former Galatasaray S.K. president Adnan Polat, and the French company EDF Energies Nouvelles.

Technical details
Soma Wind Farm was built in two phases, called Soma-1 and Soma-2. Average total annual energy generated is 405 GWh. The cost of the project totalled to €170 million. It was completed and commissioned in January 2012.

The first phase, consisting of 88 wind turbines with a total installed capacity of 79.2 MW manufactured by Enercon, cost €100 million, and was commissioned in December 2010. Each of the E-44 type turbines with  rotor diameter at  hub height generates 900 KW power. 50 of the wind turbines are atop of steel towers while the rest were installed on precast concrete towers.

The second phase extended the wind farm's power capacity about 60.9 MW.

The area has extreme winter conditions that cause icing of the rotor blades. To prevent this, some turbines are equipped with de-icing system.

Soma Wind Farm is Turkey's only wind power plant feeding electricity into grid at 380 kV.

References 

Soma District
Wind farms in Turkey
Energy infrastructure completed in 2012
2012 establishments in Turkey